Several muscles in the human body may be referred to as an oblique muscle:

Abdominal wall
Abdominal external oblique muscle
Abdominal internal oblique muscle
Extraocular muscles
Inferior oblique muscle
Superior oblique muscle
Oblique muscle of auricle, part of the outer ear

See also
Oblique strain, an injury of either of these muscles, common in baseball